Varisco is a ghost town in Brazos County, in the U.S. state of Texas. It is located within the Bryan-College Station metropolitan area.

History
Varisco was named for Biagio Varisco. It was the location of an airport in 1952, which disappeared in 1986. Only several scattered houses remained.

Geography
Varisco was located on Farm to Market Road 50 on the Southern Pacific Railroad in western Brazos County.

Education
Today, Varisco is located within the Bryan Independent School District.

References

Ghost towns in Texas